Keysbrook is an outer southern suburb of Perth, Western Australia in the Shire of Serpentine-Jarrahdale along the South Western Highway. It was first established as a railway siding on the South Western Railway in 1897, and is believed to have been named after Charles Key (1847–1885), who leased land in the area. The townsite was gazetted in 1916, and the locality was established in 1997.

References

Suburbs of Perth, Western Australia
Shire of Serpentine-Jarrahdale